is a Japanese football player. He plays for Maruyasu Okazaki.

Tsurumi previously played for Shonan Bellmare in the J2 League.

Club statistics

References

External links

1986 births
Living people
Association football people from Kanagawa Prefecture
Japanese footballers
J2 League players
Japan Football League players
Shonan Bellmare players
Gainare Tottori players
Nara Club players
FC Maruyasu Okazaki players
People from Fujisawa, Kanagawa
Association football midfielders